The following is a list of musical chords and simultaneities:

See also

References

Chords
Chords
Music theory